The Las Cienegas National Conservation Area is a National Conservation Area of Arizona, located in the transitional zone between the Sonoran Desert and the Chihuahuan Desert.

Description
The region’s rolling grasslands, oak-studded hills that connect several "sky island" mountain ranges, and lush riparian corridors attract both people and wildlife. Ciénega Creek, with its perennial flow and riparian corridor, supports a diverse plant and animal community.

The Empire and Cienega ranches, along with portions of the adjacent Rose Tree and Vera Earl ranches, were put under public ownership and managed by Bureau of Land Management (BLM) under the principles of multiple-use and ecosystem management for future generations to use and enjoy.  The BLM has formed a partnership with the nonprofit Empire Ranch Foundation, which is dedicated to preserving the historic buildings and surrounding landscapes.

Gallery

See also
Empire Ranch
List of protected grasslands of North America

References

External links

 Las Cienegas National Conservation Area - official site

Santa Cruz River (Arizona)
National Conservation Areas of the United States
Protected areas of Arizona
Grasslands of Arizona
Protected areas established in 2000
Protected areas of Pima County, Arizona
Protected areas of Santa Cruz County, Arizona
Bureau of Land Management areas in Arizona
Units of the National Landscape Conservation System
Protected areas of the Sonoran Desert
Protected areas of the Chihuahuan Desert
Geography of Pima County, Arizona
Geography of Santa Cruz County, Arizona
2000 establishments in Arizona